BRP Panglao (FPB-2402) is the second of four Boracay class Patrol Boats built by OCEA of France for the Philippine Coast Guard based on the Ocea FPB 72 design.

Construction, delivery and commissioning
BRP Panglao was launched in June 2018 at the OCEA site in Les Sables d’Olonne, France and was commissioned into service in Manila, Philippines in October 2018 along with its sister ship,.

Operational history
The drill was held in Manila Bay and featured the mock hijacking of a vessel and arrest of the perpetrators aboard the ship.

References

Ships of the Philippine Coast Guard
2018 ships
Ships built in France